Percent active chlorine is a unit of concentration used for hypochlorite-based bleaches. One gram of a 100% active chlorine bleach has the quantitative bleaching capacity as one gram of free chlorine. The term "active chlorine" is used because most commercial bleaches also contain chlorine in the form of chloride ions, which have no bleaching properties.

Liquid bleaches for domestic use fall in 3 categories: for pool-treatment (10% hypochlorite solutions, without surfactants and detergents), for laundry and general purpose cleaning, at 3–5% active chlorine (which are usually recommended to be diluted substantially before use), and in pre-mixed specialty formulations targeted at particular cleaning, bleaching or disinfecting applications.  Commercial chlorine bleaches range from under 10% active chlorine to over 40%. 

Values can be higher than 100% because hypochlorite ion has a molecular weight of 51.45 g/mol, whereas dichlorine Cl2 has a molecular weight of 70.90 g/mol.  Dichlorine has a reference bleaching potential of 100% for its molecular weight.  Hypochlorite (ClO) also has a molecule-to-molecule bleaching potential the same as dichlorine.  However, its lower molecular weight leads to a higher potential bleaching power.  In the example of lithium hypochlorite, molecular weight 58.39, it only takes 58.39 grams to equal the bleaching power of 70.90 grams of dichlorine.  Therefore, 70.9 / 58.39 = 1.214 or 121.4%.

Percent active chlorine values have now virtually replaced the older system of chlorometric degrees: 1% active chlorine is equivalent to 3.16 °Cl. Taking the (reasonable) assumption that all active chlorine present in a liquid bleach is in the form of hypochlorite ions, 1% active chlorine is equivalent to 0.141 mol/kg ClO−(0.141 mol/L if we assume density=1). For a solid bleach, 100% active chlorine is equivalent to 14.1 mol/kg  ClO−: lithium hypochlorite has a molar mass of 58.39 g/mol, equivalent to 17.1 mol/kg or 121% active chlorine.

Active chlorine values are usually determined by adding an excess of potassium iodide to a sample of bleach solution and titrating the iodine liberated by displacing it with atomic chlorine with a standard sodium thiosulfate solution and iodine indicator. 
Cl2 + 2I− → I2 + 2Cl−
or
ClO− + 2I− + 2 H+ → I2 + H2O + Cl−
then
2S2O32− + I2 → S4O62− + 2I−
From the above equations it can be seen that 2 mole of thiosulfate is equivalent to 70.9 grams of active chlorine.

Again the percentage of available chlorine can be calculated through the concept of normality. The gram equivalent of bleaching powder is equal to the gram equivalent of the standard titrant you have used then calculate the %available chlorine by weight of chlorine/weight of bleaching powder*100=amount of available chlorine